Aframomum elegans is a species in the ginger family, Zingiberaceae. It is found in Liberia.

References

External links 

 Aframomum elegans at Tropicos

elegans
Plants described in 1980
Flora of Liberia